On February 1, 1820, James Johnson (DR) of  resigned from his position as Representative.  A special election was held to fill the resulting vacancy

Election results

Gray took his seat on November 13, 1820

See also
List of special elections to the United States House of Representatives

References

Virginia 1820 20
Virginia 1820 20
1820 20
Virginia 20
United States House of Representatives 20
United States House of Representatives 1820 20